The Dabru Emet (Heb. דברו אמת "Speak [the] Truth") is a document concerning the relationship between Christianity and Judaism. It was signed by over 220 rabbis and intellectuals from all branches of Judaism, as individuals and not as representing any organisation or stream of Judaism.

In light of the Second Vatican Council in 1965, the Dabru Emet was first published on 10 September 2000, in The New York Times, and has since been used in Jewish education programs across the U.S. While affirming that there are theological differences between these two religions, the purpose of Dabru Emet is to point out common ground and a legitimacy of Christianity, for non-Jews, from the Jewish perspective. It is not an official document of any of the Jewish denominations per se, but it is representative of what many Jews feel. Eight major themes are expressed:

Jews and Christians worship the same God
Jews and Christians seek authority from the same book
Christians can respect the claim of the Jews on the land of Israel
Jews and Christians together accept the moral principles of the Torah (Pentateuch)
Nazism is not a Christian phenomenon
The controversy between Jews and Christians will not be settled until God redeems the entire world as promised in scripture and no-one should be pressed into believing another's belief
A new relationship between Jews and Christians will not weaken Jewish practice
Jews and Christians must work together for justice and peace

Jewish criticism 
There are various objections to Dabru Emet from within the Jewish community. Some hold that it understates the significant theological differences between the two religions. Thus, most Conservative and Reform rabbis have not signed it, although many do agree with most of the document. Very few Orthodox rabbis have signed it; The Institute for Public Affairs, of the Union of Orthodox Jewish Congregations (commonly known as the Orthodox Union) issued this response:

While agreeing with desire to encourage inter-faith dialogue and reconciliation, many Jews disagree with the section in Dabru Emet which holds that Christian theology is not in any way to blame for most of the last 2,000 years of anti-Semitism, or the Holocaust. Instead, it is believed by many Jews that much of Christian theology and teachings have been deeply anti-Semitic.

Orthodox Rabbis' Statement: "Christianity Is Neither Accident Nor Error"

On 3 December 2015, 28 Orthodox Rabbis released a statement through the Center for Jewish-Christian Understanding and Cooperation (CJCUC) in Israel. Rabbis David Rosen, Shlomo Riskin and Mark Dratch are prominent among them in the interfaith movement. The unprecedented declaration, entitled "To Do the Will of Our Father in Heaven: Toward a Partnership between Jews and Christians", praises “Nostra Aetate,” a Vatican document that repudiated Christian persecution against Jews. “Now that the Catholic Church has acknowledged the eternal Covenant between God and Israel, we Jews can acknowledge the ongoing constructive validity of Christianity as our partner in world redemption, without any fear that this will be exploited for missionary purposes,” it reads.

Christian reaction 
The European Lutheran Commission on the Church and the Jewish People (Lutherische Europäische Kommission Kirche und Judentum, LEKKJ), an umbrella organization representing twenty-five Lutheran church bodies in Europe, issued on May 12, 2003 A Response to Dabru Emet:

Further reading
"How not to conduct Jewish-Christian dialogue" Jon D. Levenson; Commentary; Dec 2001; Vol. 112(5)
"Jewish-Christian dialogue" Jon D. Levenson; Commentary; Apr 2002; Vol. 113(4)
"A Cordial Invitation to 170 Rabbis and Jewish Scholars" Atila Sinke Guimaraes; Tradition in Action, Los Angeles 2001

See also
Christianity
Christian–Jewish reconciliation
Judaism
Relations between Catholicism and Judaism
Religious Pluralism
Tikva Frymer-Kensky
To Do the Will of Our Father in Heaven: Toward a Partnership between Jews and Christians

References

External links
National Jewish Scholars Project - the text of Dabru Emet
Signers of Dabru Emet 
 Hebrew translation: http://yehoyada-amir.blogspot.com/
 Amy-Jill Levine: Reassessing Jewish-Christian Relations, Burke Lectureship on Religion & Society, 6/19/2001

Christian and Jewish interfaith dialogue
2000 in religion